The tram system in Augsburg is the second largest tram system in Bavaria, behind Munich and before Nurnberg. The system is 49.8 kilometers long (30.9 miles) and runs five lines, with two special lines. The city border gets crossed in three places. Line 2 and Line 6 cross into Stadtbergen, and line 6 crosses into Friedberg. The line first opened in early May 1881, with horse-drawn trams. In 1881, there was an average of 61 million yearly passengers. In 1972, the trams were electric with overhead powerlines. The system is operated by Stadtwerke Augsburg (SWA), and integrated into the Augsburger Verkehrs- und Tarifverbund (AVV).

Lines 
, the network has five regular lines and two special lines, as follows:

Special Lines 
The two special lines are lines 8 and 9. Line 8 is the line that goes from the main train station (Hauptbahnhof) to the soccer stadium (Fußball-Arena). This line only runs if there is a soccer game occurring.
Line 9 is the line that goes from the main train station (Hauptbahnhof) to the Exhibition Center (Messezentrum). This line only runs if there is an exhibition occurring.

Rolling stock
 the fleet of the Augsburg tram network consists of three MAN M8C trams, 11 ADtranz GT6M trams, 41 Siemens Combino type NF8, and 27 Bombardier Flexity type Cityflex CF8 trams. Stadler is supplying 11 new Tramlink units as a replacement for the M8C and GT6M trams. Entry into service is scheduled for 2022.

 The MAN M8C trams are mainly are on line 1 and sometimes line 2, and there are about 3 of them.
 The ADtranz GT6M trams are mainly are on line 6.
 The Siemens Combino NF8 trams are mainly on line 3
 The Bombardier Flexity "Cityflex" trams are mainly on lines 1, 2, and 4, as well as about 20 on line 3

Timetable 
On a normal week day, the trams run every five minutes from 05:00-11:00 and from 14:00-21:00. on a normal work day, the tram runs every seven and a half minutes while people are at work and school.  This is from 11:00-14:00. On a normal work day, from 21:00-0:00, the trams run every fifteen minutes. On a normal Saturday, the trams run every 10 minutes. On a normal Sunday, the trams run every fifteen minutes. On a holiday on any day the trams run every fifteen minutes. During a school break, the trams run every seven and a half minutes. Trams operate from 05:00-0:00.

Planned Changes

Line 5 
Line 5 does not exist yet and is still in the planning phase. The line is supposed to start from the main train station (Hauptbahnhof), to the University Hospital (Uniklinik).

See also
List of town tramway systems in Germany
Trams in Germany

References

Notes

Bibliography

External links
 
 Track plan of the Augsburg tram system
 
 

Transport in Augsburg
Augsburg
Metre gauge railways in Germany
600 V DC railway electrification
Augsburg